Renee Danielle Montgomery (born December 2, 1986) is an American former professional basketball player, sports broadcaster and activist who is currently vice president, part-owner, and investor of the Atlanta Dream, and one of three owners of the FCF Beasts Indoor Football Team; making her the first player in the WNBA to become an owner and executive of a team and first female owner in the FCF. During her 11-year playing career in the Women's National Basketball Association, she won two championships with the Minnesota Lynx in 2015 and 2017. During her college playing career, she won a national championship with the UConn Huskies in 2009. In 2020, Montgomery opted-out of the WNBA season in protest of police brutality, bringing forth awareness throughout the league and leading to multiple campaigns dedicated to human rights.

High school
Montgomery was a high school teammate of fellow future WNBA player Alexis Hornbuckle at South Charleston High School, where she was a captain each year of her high school career. She led the school to the West Virginia state Championships three times, averaging 22.5 points, six assists, five rebounds and five steals while leading the school to the West Virginia Class AAA Final as a senior. She also played on the varsity soccer team.

College career
She attended the University of Connecticut.

Freshman year
She started 35 of the Huskies' 37 games at point guard and was named 2006 Big East Freshman of the Year.

Sophomore year
Montgomery started in all 36 games as the Huskies' point guard.  She tallied double-figure points in 29 games, including four 20-point plus scoring efforts.  Montgomery led the team with a 13.3 scoring average and 163 assists.  She was named first team All-Big East.  In addition, Montgomery led the USA U-20 National Team to a gold medal during the summer prior to the start of the season at the FIBA U-20 Championship for Women in Mexico City.

Junior year
Montgomery was selected as an All-Big East First Team choice for the second consecutive season. She was also selected to the All-Big East Tournament Team for the third consecutive season.  Montgomery moved to the shooting guard slot on January 19, following a season-ending injury to Mel Thomas, after playing the majority of her career at point guard.  She passed the 1,000 point mark in an 82–71 UConn win over North Carolina on January 21, 2008, at Gampel Pavilion.  The Huskies lost in the Final Four to Stanford and finished the season at 36–2.

Senior year
Montgomery reached double figure points in all but four games this season, and led the Huskies to a 39–0 season and her first and only National Championship.  She finished her career in the Top Ten of many categories in the UConn women's basketball recordbooks including No. 1 in games played (150), No. 6 in career points (1,990), No. 6 in FG's (703), No. 4 in 3pt FG's (254), No. 9 in FT's (330), No. 3 in Assists (632), and No. 5 in Steals (266).  She was the first Husky to be recognized in the "Huskies of Honor" while still playing in a Husky uniform.

Sports Illustrated did a series of thirteen photographs featuring teams chasing or achieving perfect seasons—an entire season without a loss. The photograph of Coach Geno Auriemma embracing Renee Montgomery during the 2008–09 season is included in the collection.

Professional career

WNBA

Montgomery was selected fourth overall in the 2009 WNBA draft by the Minnesota Lynx.

In 2010, Montgomery was traded to the Connecticut Sun, as part of a trade involving Minnesota native Lindsay Whalen and the first pick in the 2010 draft, with which the Sun selected Tina Charles, Montgomery's former college teammate. In college, Montgomery wore 20 as a uniform number. Players often become attached to their numbers, some more than others. Renee liked her number so much that her personal website is  reneemontgomery20.com. The Sun also added veteran Kara Lawson to the team, who had worn No. 20 in college and with the Sacramento Monarchs, so Montgomery wore No. 21 for the Sun.

During the 2009–10 collegiate basketball season, Montgomery occasionally worked as a color commentator for women's college games broadcast on the ESPN family of networks.

During the 2011 WNBA season, Montgomery had the best season of her career once she became the starting point guard for the Sun. She averaged 14.6 ppg and was voted as an all-star for the first time in her career.

In 2012, Montgomery came off the bench for the Sun, but was still effective, averaging 11.6 ppg and winning WNBA Sixth Woman of the Year. The Sun made it to the playoffs that year and were one win away from advancing to the Finals, but were eliminated by the eventual champions Indiana Fever in game 3 of the Eastern Conference Finals.

On January 28, 2015, the Connecticut Sun traded Montgomery along with their third and fifteen overall picks in the 2015 WNBA draft to the Seattle Storm in exchange for Camille Little and Shekinna Stricklen.

On July 20, 2015, Montgomery was reacquired by the Minnesota Lynx in a trade for Monica Wright. Montgomery ended up winning her first WNBA championship with the Lynx after they defeated the Indiana Fever in the Finals.

In 2016, Montgomery played a full season for the Lynx for the first time since her rookie season. She averaged 7.5 ppg off the bench and the Lynx were in the hunt to win back-to-back championships, but lost to the Los Angeles Sparks in the Finals.

In 2017, Montgomery averaged 8.0 ppg and achieved a new career-high in field goal shooting percentage. Montgomery also started in 12 of 34 games played while Whalen was sidelined with a hand injury. The Lynx continued to be a championship contender in the league after making it to the Finals for the sixth time in seven seasons, setting up a rematch with the Sparks. This time the Lynx would win in 5 games, winning their fourth championship in seven seasons, tying the now-defunct Houston Comets for most championship titles.

On February 1, 2018, Montgomery signed a multi-year contract with the Atlanta Dream. She would be the starting point guard for the team. On August 12, 2018, Montgomery scored a season-high 30 points along with a career-high 8 three-pointers in an 86–77 victory over the New York Liberty, tying the regular season record for most three-pointers in a game. She also hit 7 of her 8 three-pointers in the second half, breaking the WNBA record for most three-pointers in a half. By the end of the season, Montgomery set the franchise record for most three-pointers made in a season. The Dream finished 23–11 with the number 2 seed in the league, receiving a double-bye to the semi-finals. Without the team's leading scorer Angel McCoughtry, who was sidelined with a knee injury, the Dream were short-handed in the playoffs and lost in five games to the Washington Mystics.

In June 2020, Montgomery announced that she would forgo the 2020 WNBA season due to concerns of racism and the coronavirus. In February 2021, she announced her retirement from the WNBA.

Overseas
In the 2009-10 off-season, Montgomery played in Lithuania for BC VIČI-Aistės Kaunas. In the 2010-11 off-season, she played in Israel for Maccabi Bnot Ashdod. In the 2012-13 off-season, she played in Russia for Nadezhda Orenburg. In the 2013–14 off-season, she played for Tarsus in Turkey and for Vologda-Chevakata in Russia; in the 2014-15 off-season, she again played for Vologda-Chevakata. In the 2015-16 off-season, she played in Australia for the Canberra Capitals. She signed with Basket 90 Gdynia in Poland for the 2016-17 off-season. In 2017, Montgomery signed with Maccabi Ramat Hen of the Israeli League for the 2017-18 off-season.

USA Basketball

Montgomery was invited to the USA Basketball Women's National Team training camp in the fall of 2009. The team selected to play for the FIBA World Championship and the Summer Olympics is usually chosen from these participants.

At the conclusion of the training camp, the team traveled to Ekaterinburg, Russia, where they competed in the 2009 UMMC Ekaterinburg International Invitational.

Montgomery was one of twenty players named to the national team pool, from which twelve players would be chosen to represent the US in the 2010 FIBA World Championships and the 2012 Olympics.

Montgomery was named as one of the National team members to represent the USA Basketball team in the WNBA versus USA Basketball. This game replaced the normal WNBA All-Star game with WNBA All-Stars versus USA Basketball, as part of the preparation for the FIBA World Championship for Women to be held in the Czech Republic during September and October 2010.

Career statistics

College

WNBA

Regular season

|-
| style="text-align:left;"| 2009
| style="text-align:left;"| Minnesota
| 34 || 9 || 22.5 || .408 || .347 || .833 || 1.9 || 2.1 || 0.7 || 0.3 || 1.9 || 9.0
|-
| style="text-align:left;"| 2010
| style="text-align:left;"| Connecticut
| 34 || 23 || 27.6 || .401 || .349 || .855 || 2.2 || 4.1 || 1.3 || 0.1 || 2.2 || 13.3
|-
| style="text-align:left;"| 2011
| style="text-align:left;"| Connecticut
| 34 || 34 || 29.1 || .400 || .384 || .829 || 2.1 || 4.9 || 1.4 || 0.1 || 2.6 || 14.6
|-
| style="text-align:left;"| 2012
| style="text-align:left;"| Connecticut
| 34 || 0 || 24.0 || .348 || .364 || .848 || 1.9 || 2.6 || 1.0 || 0.1 || 2.2 || 11.6
|-
| style="text-align:left;"| 2013
| style="text-align:left;"| Connecticut
| 23 || 18 || 27.2 || .365 || .327 || .897|| 1.8 || 3.1 || 0.7 || 0.0 || 2.4 || 10.1
|-
| style="text-align:left;"| 2014
| style="text-align:left;"| Connecticut
| 33 || 0 || 16.2 || .373 || .330 || .775 || 0.8 || 2.4 || 0.6 || 0.1 || 1.3 || 6.7
|-
| style="text-align:left;"| 2015*
| style="text-align:left;"| Seattle
| 17 || 2 || 17.8 || .377 || .392 || .870 || 1.8 || 3.0 || 0.9 || 0.2 || 2.0 || 7.1
|-
| style="text-align:left;"| 2015*
| style="text-align:left;"| Minnesota
| 17 || 5 || 17.9 || .368 || .232 || .714 || 1.2 || 2.5 || 0.6 || 0.1 || 1.0 || 5.7
|-
|style="text-align:left;background:#afe6ba;"| 2015†
| style="text-align:left;"| Total
| 34 || 7 || 17.8 || .372 || .312 || .759 || 1.5 || 2.7 || 0.7 || 0.1 || 1.0 || 6.4
|-
| style="text-align:left;"| 2016
| style="text-align:left;"| Minnesota
| 34 || 2 || 19.3 || .397 || .321 || .828 || 0.9 || 2.8 || 0.9 || 0.1 || 1.7 || 7.5
|-
|style="text-align:left;background:#afe6ba;"| 2017†
| style="text-align:left;"| Minnesota
| 34 || 12 || 21.8 || .424 || .358 || .842 || 1.6 || 3.4 || 0.7 || 0.1 || 1.7 || 8.0
|-
| style="text-align:left;"| 2018
| style="text-align:left;"| Atlanta
| 34 || 34 || 27.5 || .389 || .371 || .881 || 1.7 || 3.7 || 1.3 || 0.1 || 1.6 || 10.3
|-
| style="text-align:left;"| 2019
| style="text-align:left;"| Atlanta
| 34 || 34 || 27.9 || .370 || .324 || .824 || 2.2 || 2.6 || 0.9 || 0.2 || 1.9 || 9.5
|-
| style="text-align:left;"| Career
| style="text-align:left;"| 10 years, 5 teams
| 364 || 173 || 23.6 || .386 || .347 || .840 || 1.7 || 3.1 || 1.0 || 0.1 || 1.9 || 9.7

Postseason

|-
| style="text-align:left;"| 2011
| style="text-align:left;"| Connecticut
| 2 || 2 || 28.5 || .471 || .333 || .875 || 1.5 || 4.5 || 0.5 || 0.5 || 3.5 || 13.0
|-
| style="text-align:left;"| 2012
| style="text-align:left;"| Connecticut
| 5 || 0 || 24.0 || .393 || .412 || .833 || 1.2 || 3.4 || 0.4 || 0.0 || 1.4 || 6.8
|-
|style="text-align:left;background:#afe6ba;"| 2015†
| style="text-align:left;"| Minnesota
| 9 || 0 || 9.7 || .478 || .308 || .875 || 0.3 || 0.9 || 0.6 || 0.1 || 0.5 || 3.7
|-
| style="text-align:left;"| 2016
| style="text-align:left;"| Minnesota
| 8 || 0 || 12.6 || .370 || .444 || .900 || 0.4 || 1.9 || 0.5 || 0.0 || 1.0 || 4.1
|-
|style="text-align:left;background:#afe6ba;"| 2017†
| style="text-align:left;"| Minnesota
| 8 || 0 || 17.1 || .449 || .393 || .500 || 1.3 || 1.9 || 0.5 || 0.2 || 1.2 || 7.0
|-
| style="text-align:left;"| 2018
| style="text-align:left;"| Atlanta
| 5 || 5 || 31.7 || .293 || .286 || .846 || 2.0 || 4.2 || 0.2 || 0.2 || 1.8 || 8.6
|-
| style="text-align:left;"| Career
| style="text-align:left;"|6 years, 3 teams
| 37 || 7 || 17.9 || .400 || .356 || .851 || 0.9 || 2.3 || 0.5 || 0.1 || 1.2 || 6.1

Post-playing career

Ownership of Atlanta Dream 
In February 2021, Montgomery was part of a three-member investor group that was approved to purchase the Atlanta Dream. The ownership change followed pressure on former owner Kelly Loeffler, a Republican former U.S. Senator who had angered WNBA players with her opposition to the league's racial justice initiatives, to sell her share of the Dream. Loeffler had previously refused a visit with Montgomery on social justice initiatives.

Ownership of FCF Beasts 
On January 4, 2021, Montgomery joined Miro and Marshawn Lynch as a partial owner of the FCF Beasts of Fan Controlled Football.

Broadcasting 
In 2020, Montgomery began working as a studio analyst for Fox Sports Southeast's broadcasts of Atlanta Hawks games. She had previously appeared on the network as a guest analyst.

In March 2021, Montgomery was announced as the co-host of a Crooked Media podcast titled Takeline with Jason Concepcion.

Montgomery called 2021 NCAA women's basketball tournament games for ESPN alongside Beth Mowins.

In September 2021, Montgomery joined Meadowlark Media, for which she makes the podcast Montgomery & Co..

Personal life
In April 2020, Montgomery married music artist Sirena Grace.

Awards and honors
 2005 McDonald's All-America.
 2005 Gatorade West Virginia High School Player of the Year.
 2005 Street & Smith Third Team All-America.
 2005 Associated Press West Virginia Player of the Year.
 2005 WBCA Honorable Mention All-America.
 2004 Street & Smith Third Team All-America.
 2003 Street & Smith Honorable Mention All-America
 2009 Nancy Lieberman Award – Top Point Guard
 2009 Honda Sports Award, basketball
 2009 Finalist for Honda-Broderick Cup
 2009 Frances Pomeroy Naismith Award
 2009 Gazette Sportsperson of the Year

See also
 List of Connecticut women's basketball players with 1000 points

References

External links

 UConn Husky Bio
 WNBA bio

1986 births
Living people
All-American college women's basketball players
American expatriate basketball people in Australia
American expatriate basketball people in Israel
American expatriate basketball people in Lithuania
American expatriate basketball people in Poland
American expatriate basketball people in Russia
American women's basketball players
Atlanta Dream owners
Basketball players from West Virginia
Connecticut Sun players
LGBT basketball players
LGBT people from West Virginia
Lesbian sportswomen
McDonald's High School All-Americans
Minnesota Lynx draft picks
Minnesota Lynx players
People from St. Albans, West Virginia
People from South Charleston, West Virginia
Point guards
Seattle Storm players
South Charleston High School alumni
UConn Huskies women's basketball players
Women's National Basketball Association All-Stars
American LGBT sportspeople